Humansville is a city in Polk County, Missouri, United States. As of the 2010 census, the city population was 1,048. It is part of the Springfield, Missouri Metropolitan Statistical Area. Carl Long is the current mayor, sworn in on October 7, 2019.

History

Humansville was named after an American settler, Judge James G. Human, who settled in the area in 1834. A post office called Humansville has been in operation since 1839.

During the Civil War, a skirmish was fought on the town's outskirts on March 26, 1862, in which approximately 300 to 400 Missouri Confederates under Col. James M. Frazier of Cedar County clashed with two companies of pro-Union Missouri State Militia. Casualties were few, but Col. Frazier was himself mortally wounded, which caused the Confederates to retreat.

The George Dimmitt Memorial Hospital was listed on the National Register of Historic Places in 2012.

Geography
Humansville sits on Brush Creek and the line of the old Kansas City, Clinton and Springfield Railway.

Demographics

2010 census
As of the census of 2010, there were 1,048 people, 366 households, and 227 families living in the city. The racial makeup of the city was 96.6% White, 0.1% African American, 0.6% Native American, 0.1% Asian, 0.2% from other races, and 2.5% from two or more races. Hispanic or Latino of any race were 3.8% of the population.

There were 366 households, of which 31.7% had children under the age of 18 living with them, 42.3% were married couples living together, 13.9% had a female householder with no husband present, 5.7% had a male householder with no wife present, and 38.0% were non-families. 34.2% of all households were made up of individuals, and 20.2% had someone living alone who was 65 years of age or older. The average household size was 2.42 and the average family size was 3.04.

The median age in the city was 45.9 years. 21.4% of residents were under the age of 18; 7.7% were between the ages of 18 and 24; 20% were from 25 to 44; 25.5% were from 45 to 64; and 25.7% were 65 years of age or older. The gender makeup of the city was 46.9% male and 53.1% female.

2000 census
As of the census of 2000, there were 946 people, 389 households, and 219 families living in the city. The population density was 794.0 people per square mile (306.9/km2). There were 465 housing units at an average density of 390.3 per square mile (150.9/km2). The racial makeup of the city was 98.20% White, 0.42% African American, 0.32% Native American, 0.21% Asian, and 0.85% from two or more races. Hispanic or Latino of any race were 0.63% of the population.

There were 389 households, out of which 24.7% had children under the age of 18 living with them, 42.4% were married couples living together, 11.6% had a female householder with no husband present, and 43.7% were non-families. 39.3% of all households were made up of individuals, and 22.4% had someone living alone who was 65 years of age or older. The average household size was 2.15 and the average family size was 2.89.

In the city the population was spread out, with 21.2% under the age of 18, 5.5% from 18 to 24, 24.6% from 25 to 44, 20.6% from 45 to 64, and 28.0% who were 65 years of age or older. The median age was 44 years. For every 100 females, there were 86.2 males. For every 100 females age 18 and over, there were 78.7 males.

The median income for a household in the city was $19,821, and the median income for a family was $29,018. Males had a median income of $21,181 versus $14,423 for females. The per capita income for the city was $11,051. About 11.9% of families and 18.7% of the population were below the poverty line, including 16.0% of those under age 18 and 22.0% of those age 65 or over.

Education
Humansville R-IV School District operates one elementary school and Humansville High School.

Humansville has a public library, a branch of the Polk County Library.

Circle of Hope Girls Ranch was located in Humansville.

Notable people
 Zoë Akins, (1886–1958), became a successful poet, playwright, and screenwriter.
 Edgar Buchanan (1903–1979), who had a long career in movies and television. He portrayed Uncle Joe on Petticoat Junction in the 1960s.
 James B. Potter, Jr. (born 1931), Los Angeles City Council member, 1963–1971
 Kathie Browne (1930-2003), stage, film and television actress.
 Billie Moore (1943–2022), American college basketball coach.

References

Further reading
 Encyclopedia of the History of Missouri, by Howard Louis Conrad, 1901.  Page 324.
 Woman's Who's Who of America, by John William Leonard, 1914.  Page 40.

External links
 Historic maps of Humansville in the Sanborn Maps of Missouri Collection at the University of Missouri

Cities in Polk County, Missouri
Springfield metropolitan area, Missouri
Cities in Missouri